Manuel "Manolo" Cintrón Vega (born January 4, 1963 in Ponce, Puerto Rico) is a former Puerto Rican professional basketball player, who for 11 seasons in the 1980s and early 1990s played with several teams in the National Basketball League in Puerto Rico., including the Atléticos de San Germán, the Leones de Ponce and the Gigantes de Carolina.

He is the former head coach of the Puerto Rico national basketball team, after being replaced in 2011 by Flor Melendez. He is the head coach of Veracruz´s "Halcones Rojos" in the Mexican Professional Basketball League.

In the past, he has been the head coach of: the "Explosivos de Moca" (PR, 2001–2002), the "Toros de Aragua Maracay" (Ven, 2002), the "Vaqueros de Bayamón" (PR, 2002), the "Capitanes de Arecibo" (PR, 2003), the "Explosivos de Moca" (PR, 2003–2004), the "Leones de Ponce" (PR, 2004–2006), the "Indios de Mayagüez" (PR, 2007) and the "Vaqueros de Bayamón" (PR, 2008).
 
As the assistant head coach of Puerto Rico from 2001 to 2006, he helped the team obtain gold at the 2001 Centrobasket. In 2007, he became Puerto Rico's head coach, taking over the work done by Julio Toro. He has managed to team to a gold medal at the 2008 Centrobasket, to silver medals at the 2007 Pan American Games and the 2009 FIBA Americas Championship and a bronze medal at the 2007 FIBA Americas Championship.

References

1963 births
Atléticos de San Germán players
Puerto Rican men's basketball players
Baloncesto Superior Nacional players
Leones de Ponce basketball players
Living people
Sportspeople from Ponce, Puerto Rico
Point guards